The men's 800 metres at the 2013 World Championships in Athletics was held at the Luzhniki Stadium on 10–13 August.

In the final, Duane Solomon characteristically took out the pace at just about 50 seconds.  Uncharacteristically, second place was occupied by his teammate Nick Symmonds, known for his come from behind tactics.  On the final lap the two formed a team USA wall to prevent the rest of the field from getting around.  Solomon held the lead into the final straight with Symmonds about to pounce.  Mohammed Aman was behind Solomon in a box pinned in by Ayanleh Souleiman.  Souleiman slowed as Symmonds slingshotted off the back stretch. The door opened and Aman took off in chase of Symmonds, passing him on the outside 20 meters before the finish.  Solomon went out too fast and hence slowed in the final 50 meters, and Souleiman was the next fastest to the finish to pick up bronze.  Aman's 1:43.31 is a new Russian soil all comers record.

Records
Prior to the competition, the records were as follows:

Qualification standards

Schedule

Results

Heats
Qualification: First 3 in each heat (Q) and the next 6 fastest (q) advanced to the semifinals.

Semifinals
Qualification: First 2 in each heat (Q) and the next 2 fastest (q) advanced to the final.

Final
The final was held at 21:10.

References

External links
800 metres results at IAAF website

800
800 metres at the World Athletics Championships